Silvana Botti is a full professor for Physics at the University of Jena. She is an expert in the development of first-principles methods for electronic excitations and methods for theoretical spectroscopy.

Education and professional life 
She did her PhD at the University of Pavia in 2002. After her PhD, she was a Marie-Curie Fellow at the University of Paris-Saclay. She was also appointed CNRS Research Scientist there in 2004. In 2008, she moved to University of Lyon where she habilitated in 2010. Since 2014, she is a full professor for physics at the University of Jena. Her research group is a member of the  European Theoretical Spectroscopy Facility.

Research 
Her research focuses on theoretical spectroscopy and the development of first-principles methods for electronic excitations based on (time-dependent) density functional theory and many-body perturbation theory. She edited the book "First Principles Approaches to Spectroscopic Properties of Complex Materials". She is an associate editor of npj Computational Materials. Her research on a silicon-based direct bandgap light emitter was announced to be the "Breakthrough of the Year" by Physics World.

References 

Academic staff of the University of Jena
Women physicists
German women physicists
Year of birth missing (living people)
Living people
21st-century German physicists